Konar Malek (also Romanized as Konār Mālek) is a village in Aviz Rural District, in the Central District of Farashband County, Fars Province, Iran. At the 2006 census, its population was 871, in 180 families.

References 

Populated places in Farashband County